Aleksandr Leonovich Kemurdzhian (4 October 192125 February 2003) was a Soviet mechanical engineer who worked at the VNIITransmash institute for the most of the second half of the 20th century. He is best known for designing the metal chases for Lunokhod 1, the first ever planetary rover for space exploration in the Soviet space program.

Early life
Kemurdzhian was born to Armenian parents on 4 October 1921 in Vladikavkaz, today the capital of North Ossetia. His father (b. 1898) and mother (b. 1901) were volunteers in the Russian Civil War with the 11th Red Army who happened to be in Vladikavkaz at the time of his birth. His paternal grandparents were from Trebizond who settled in Batumi in the late 19th century. His mother was from Rostov-on-Don.

In 1940 he enrolled at the Bauman Higher Technical College in Moscow. With the start of the Eastern Front of World War II in 1941, he and other students of the tank department were assigned to repair damaged tanks until the institute was evacuated to Izhevsk. In early 1942 he volunteered to join the Soviet Army. He participated in the battles of Kursk, the Dnieper, and the Vistula–Oder Offensive. He rose to the rank of senior lieutenant by the time he was demobilized in 1946. For his services, he was awarded the Order of Courage, Order of the Red Star (1944), Order of the Patriotic War (1945, 1995), Order of the Badge of Honour, and the Medal "For Battle Merit". Due to the disruption caused by the war, Kemurdzhian graduated from the department of tracked vehicles of the Bauman Higher Technical College in 1951, some 11 years after enrolling.

Career
In 1951 Kemurdzhian began working at the Leningrad-based All-Union Scientific-Research Institute No. 100 (VNII-100, now known as VNIITransmash), whose "primary expertise was building tanks for the Soviet Army." Kemurdzhian's research focused on continuously variable transmission in tracked vehicles. In 1957 he defended his kandidat nauk thesis. From 1959 on Kemurdzhian led research on air-cushion vehicles (hovercraft).

Kemurdzhian authored 200 scientific publications (mostly papers, some six monographs) and patented 50 inventions.

Work on lunar rovers
Between 1963 and 1973 Kemurdzhian headed the team assigned to develop the chassis for the Lunokhod programme. His team designed both Lunokhod 1 (1970) and Lunokhod 2 (1973). In 1969 he was named deputy director and chief designer at VNIITransmash. Under his leadership, the institute became a leader of space transport engineering. In 1971 he became Doctor of Technical Sciences after defending his dissertation based on his work on Lunokhod 1. He was named professor in 1977.

Kemurdzhian was personally interested in spaceflight and "remote-controlled space probes," which was known to Sergei Korolev. In September 1963 Korolev met with VNIITransmash engineers to discuss the possibilities of developing lunar rovers. The design sketches for the first lunar rover were completed by September 1965. Kemurdzhian provided the main report on the possibility of creating the lunar rover. Georgy Babakin, director of OKB Lavochkin, and Kemurdzhian worked closely to design the Ye-8 in 1966. In 1967 a final lunar rover design was reached and a prototype was constructed. Early models were sent to the moon on Luna 11, Luna 12 (1966) and Luna 14 (1968). Lunokhod 1, the finalized version, was designed by Kemurdzhian and Babakin. Kemurdzhian is credited with being the chief designer of the self-propelled chassis of Lunokhod-1.

Lunokhod 1 was carried to the moon by Luna 17, which was launched on 10 November and landed on the moon on 17 November 1970. It was the "first successful rover to operate beyond Earth" and the "first self-propelled, crewless vehicle to operate on the moon." It carried cameras, transmitters and scientific instruments. It also completed over 500 lunar soil tests.

Work on Mars lander vehicle
The M71 landers—Mars 2 and Mars 3—which were launched in 1971, both carried a small walking robot called PrOP-M (ПрОП-М, Pribor otsenki prokhodimosti – Mars, "Passability Estimating Vehicle for Mars") developed by Kemurdzian at VNIITransmash.

Later years and death
In response to the Chernobyl disaster, Kemurdzhian led a team of researchers to develop, in May 1986, the robot STR-1 (СТР-1) to support the Chernobyl liquidators to investigate and cleanup the area. In Chernobyl he was exposed to excessive radiation and was treated in a Moscow hospital for radiation burns.

Kemurdzhian retired in 1998. In 2000 he became a founding member of the St. Petersburg Branch of the Russian Academy of Cosmonautics (StPB RAC). In November 2000 he was the chief speaker at the 30th anniversary of the Lunokhod meeting held at the Tovstonogov Bolshoi Drama Theater. His last public appearance took place in mid-January 2003. A few days later he suffered a hip fracture and was hospitalized. He died in Saint Peteresburg on 24 or 25 February, 2003.

Recognition
Kemurdzhian is recognized as the "founder of the Russian school of design of planetary rovers." For his work on lunar rovers, Kemurdzhian received the Lenin Prize in 1973. A minor planet discovered on 26 August 1976 by Nikolai Chernykh at the Crimean Astrophysical Observatory was named 5933 Kemurdzhian. He was a member of The Planetary Society, the European Geosciences Union, and other learned societies. Documents, photos, and other archival materials on Kemurdzhian are kept at the Russian State Archive of Scientific-Technical Documentation.

Malenkov described him as follows: "A sharp mind, quick wit, and immediate response in all, including unexpected, situations; professionalism, encyclopedic erudition, commitment and hard work, multiplied by boundless energy; natural qualities of a leader of any assembly of people or experts, gathered by chance or by virtue of production relations; a charming conversationalist, a poet, and a great storyteller..."

In October 2021 the 100th anniversary of Kemurdzhian's birth was commemorated in Armenia with a conference and a postage stamp.

See also 
List of Russian inventors
List of Armenian inventors and discoverers

References
Notes

Citations

Bibliography

External links

1921 births
2003 deaths
People from Vladikavkaz
Armenian scientists
Armenian inventors
Armenian engineers
Russian aerospace engineers
Soviet aerospace engineers
Soviet space program personnel
Bauman Moscow State Technical University alumni
Soviet Armenians
Soviet inventors
Soviet military personnel of World War II